The Envision Athletic Centre is a  multi-purpose athletics facility on the campus of the University of the Fraser Valley in Abbotsford, British Columbia, Canada. It opened in May 2002 and was upgraded in 2005.  It hosts the university of the Fraser Valley Cascades basketball team on a basketball court that seats 1,700.  It also has a second court seating 350.

References

University of the Fraser Valley